The Samaria Ostraca are 102 ostraca found in 1910 in excavations in Sebastia, Nablus (ancient Samaria) led by George Andrew Reisner of the Harvard Semitic Museum. Of the 102, only 63 are legible. The ostraca are written in the paleo-Hebrew alphabet, which very closely resemble those of the Siloam Inscription, but show a slight development of the cursive script. The primary inscriptions are known as KAI 183–188.

These ostraca were found in the treasury of the palace of Ahab, king of Israel (Samaria) and probably date about his period, 850–750 BC. They are currently held in the collection of the Istanbul Archaeology Museums.

Description

They are written on fragments of five different types of vessels—large thick amphorae, with a drab or grey surface; large thin amphorae, with a drab or grey surface; jugs of soft brown ware with a reddish slip; basins of the same ware; and bowls of coarse ware with a red or yellow slip, all of these presumably being vessels that were used in receiving and storing the revenue. Sherds with a smooth surface or a slip would naturally be preferred for writing.

These ostraca are evidently part of a somewhat clumsy method of book-keeping. Either they were a "day-book," notes of daily receipts to be written up in some form of "ledger" afterwards; or they were the sole record kept of the amount of wine and oil received in various years from various places. It is possible they were written and handed in by the payer, not by the receiver.

All of them began with a date, such as "In the ninth, tenth, or fifteenth year" presumably of the reign of Ahab. This is followed by the amount and quality of wine or oil received, with the name of the place where it came from and of the giver, such as "in the tenth year wine of Kerm-ha-Tell for a jar of fine oil" where evidently wine was accepted in place of fine oil. "A jar of old wine" and "a jar of fine oil" are the most usual descriptions.

Examples
Ostracon No. I contains a list of amounts paid in by five people. It reads : IN THE TENTH YEAR. To SHEMARYAU. FROM BEER-YAM Jars of Old Wine. Rage', son of Elisha'......  'Uzza, son of  .. i Eliba, son of  i Ba'ala, son of Elisha...... i Yeda 'Yau, son of  .. i

Ostracon No. 2 is a similar document: IN THE TENTH YEAR. To GADDIYAU. FROM AZAH Jars of Old Wine. Abi-ba'al Ahaz .. Sheba' Meriba'al

Ostracon, No. 18 In the tenth year. From Hazeroth to Gaddiyau. A jar of fine oil.

Ostracon, No- 30 In the fifteenth year. From Shemida to Hillez (son of) Gaddiyau. Gera (son of) Hanniab.

Samaria Ostracon, No. 55 In the tenth year. (From the) vineyard of Yehau-eli. A jar of fine oil.

Names of places
Some names are of the villages or districts, and others are names of the peasant farmers who paid their taxes in the form of jars of wine. Of the places mentioned on these Ostraca, Shechem is the only one that can be identified with a text occurring in the Hebrew Bible (Christian Old Testament). In Kerm-ha-Tell, and Kerm-Yahu-'ali, the word Kerm must mean " the village, or vineyard," Tell means "mound", maybe referring to modern Tulkarm in Samaria. Six of these place-names occur in the Hebrew Bible as "tribal subdivisions of Manasseh", in Joshua 17:2. and :
Abi-'Ezer
Khelek
Shechem,
Shemida'
No'ah
Hoglah

The names of the seventeen places occurring on these Ostraca are: 
Abi-'ezer,
Azat Par'an (?),
Azzo, may be current village of Azzon
Beer-yam
Elmatan, may be Immatain
Gib, may be current village of Gaba or Jaba'
Haserot, may be Asira ash Shamaliya  
Yasot, may be current village of Yasid
Kerm-ha-Tell, may be current town of Tulkarm
Sepher - may be modern-day Saffarin
Shemida',
Shiftan, may be current village of Shoufa
Kheleq,
Khoglah,
No'ah Shekem,
Shereq.

Names of royal officials
These names are preceded by the word " to," indicating that they were the recipients.
The names occurring are :

Ba'alzamar (cf. Baal-saman, Stele of Zakir).
Akhino'am.
Shemaryau.
Gaddiyau.
Isha Akhimelek—/ Isha, son of Akhimelek.
Nimshi (?).
Bedyau (?).
Akhima.
Kheles.
Kheles Gaddiyau—i.e., Kheles, son of Gaddiyau.
Kheles Afsakh—/.*., Kheles, son of Afsakh.
Khanan Ba'ara.
Gomer.
Khanndno 'ana.
Yeda'yau.
Yeda'yau Akhimelek—; Yeda'yau son of Akhimelek.

Most of these names sound very unusual and un-Biblical. In form they recall more strongly names occurring in the Tell-el-Amarna Letters and the records of Thothmes III's
conquests in Syria.

Names of taxpayers
Some of the names of taxpayers on these sherds are :

Names with " son of."
Rage' Elisha.
'Alah Ela.
Gera Khaimi'ab.
Ye'ush of Yasheb (?)
Ba'al combinations
Ba'ala of El Mettan.
Ba'ala Elisha.
Ba'al B(asalme'oni ?)
Isha Ba'al'azkar.
Abi-Ba'al.
Meri-ba'al.
Ba'ala Za(kar).
Single.
Eliba.
Akhima.
Akhaz.
Sheba.
Qedar of Saq.
Uzza.
Kheles of Khaserot.
Akhzai of Khaserot.
' Yau " Combinations.
Yeda'yau.
Gera Yauyosheb. (Gera son of Yauyosheb)
Mafna-yau Natao (son of) of Yasot,
Abed-yau. (Servant of Yau.)
Abi-yau. (Child of Yau.)
Marnayau Gaddiyau. (Marnayau son of Gaddiyau.)

In these personal names unfamiliar as most of them are, we are struck at once with the fact that Ba'al occurs in their formation with as great frequency as Yahveh or Yah appears
in Biblical names of the Kingdom of Judah. It is significant of the influence of Sidonian worship of Ba'al in the Northern Kingdom. Yet, if the syllable "yau" is part of the word
Yahveh, with " h " dropped out, it would appear that in some families the worship of Yahveh is also reflected in the family name.

These lists of names bear clear testimony as to the co-existence of Ba'al worship alongside of the worship of Yahveh in Northern Israel.

On the sherds found, the only years mentioned are the ninth, tenth, fifteenth, and seventeenth, and the only materials are wine and oil.

Biblical names
The names Kheles, Akhinoam, Akhimelek, Kha-nan, Ba'ara (female), Gomer (female), Meribaal, are all Biblical, while Gaddiyau and Shemaryau are the northern forms of Gedaiah and Shemariah. Some of the Ba'al combinations are of course, Phoenician—e.g., Ba'alzamar. The names Abiba'al,
Ahaz, Sheba9 Elisha, 9Uzza, Ela, Gera, Rafa, and Natan (Nathan), are all Biblical.

As no complete jar seems to have been found, it is impossible to say what the quantities were, nor can we say whether the jar of oil and the jar of wine were equivalent in value. The
inscribed jar-handles of revenue jars found on Ophel appeared for several reasons to belong to jars of no great size, but here again no complete jar was found. No inscribed jar-handles, such as were found at Tel Gezer and the Ophel, were found at Samaria.

See also
List of artifacts significant to the Bible
Arad ostraca
Lachish letters

Bibliography
 Noegel, Scott B. "The Samaria Ostraca.", The Ancient Near East: Historical Sources, Blackwell (2006), 396–399.
 Duncan, J.Garrow. "Digging Up Biblical History Recent Archeology In Palestine And Its Bearing On The Old Testament Historical Narratives".

References

9th-century BC inscriptions
8th-century BC inscriptions
1910 archaeological discoveries
Hebrew inscriptions
KAI inscriptions
Ancient Israel and Judah
Ostracon
Collection of the Istanbul Archaeology Museums
Archaeological artifacts